Jasmine Pradissitto is a London-based artist, scientist, academic and speaker whose work focusses on the themes of environmentalism and sustainability. She is the sole artist licensed to use Noxtek, a geopolymer that absorbs nitrogen dioxide pollution from the air.

Early life and education 
Pradissitto was born in Taunton, Somerset, to an Italian father and a French mother. She would travel to Italy in the summer as a child and has said she sees Italy as her spiritual home. She has said her interest in art started with copying from nature picture books and encyclopedias, before she took an interest in comic books and graphic novels.

Pradissitto obtained a PhD from University College London on the quantum behaviour of silicon in fibre optics in 1996. Whilst at UCL, she simultaneously studied a foundation degree in fine art at Goldsmiths College, taking classes during evenings. She subsequently completed a BA in fine art at the Sir John Cass School of Art, Architecture and Design in 2006, where she undertook two years of printmaking.

Career 
Pradissitto’s work primarily focusses on issues of environmentalism, ecology, sustainability and the intersection between art and science, and has been exhibited at over 65 exhibitions and shows worldwide. As well as being a painter, she has become best known for both her sculptures made of recycled plastics and her unique use of Noxtek, a geopolymer that absorbs the harmful pollutant nitrogen dioxide from the air. She spent two years pioneering Noxtek's use for art and is currently the only artist in the world licensed to the use the geopolymer in their work.

In 2018 Pradissitto was commissioned by MTArt Agency to work with the Mayor of London Fund and the Euston Town Business Regeneration District to produce Breathe, a sculpture produced with Noxtek. The piece, which was inspired by ancient Greek and Roman sculptures of marble and stone, formed part of the Euston Green Link walking route which was designed to encourage commuters to use less polluted streets around Euston station.

In 2019 Pradissitto was commissioned by MTArt Agency to collaborate with Carrie Jenkinson, a milliner, to produce a hat for Serena Churchill, great-granddaughter of Winston Churchill, to wear at Ascot. The hat featured plastic butterflies and was partially made from recycled plastic; Pradissitto says she used the hat as a means of highlighting the threats butterflies face from environmental change and endangered biodiverse habitats.

Pradissitto was previously represented by Marine Tanguy and MTArt Agency. In 2020 she was among a group of MTArt Agency artists who designed a series of bottles for eco-friendly cleaning brand Method.

In May 2020 Pradissitto produced a new sculpture, Flower Girl, for a specially planted bee garden at the Horniman Museum in London. Made entirely of Noxtek, the sculpture is able to absorb up to 15% of its own weight in NOx molecules. The piece was designed to help local bees, as nitrogen dioxide masks the smell of flowers and prevents bees from being able to find food.

Later in 2020 Pradissitto was shortlisted for the inaugural Sustainability First Art Prize.

Pradissitto has established an outreach education consultancy that teaches STEAM subjects to children and teachers. She has also lectured for companies including Glaxo and the BBC, and continues to speak on creative and divergent thinking for institutions including the Institute of Physics and the Institute of Civil Engineers. She is also a Visiting Lecturer on Creativity at the London South Bank University.

Personal life 
Pradissitto lives in South London.

Influences for her work include the worlds of science and art, ancient Greek mythology, mythopoetry, technology and the Anthropocene world. Pradissitto has said how her son suffering an asthma attack in 2016 also served as an inspiration for her artwork and its focus on clean air and more sustainable ways of living.

References 

1966 births
Living people
20th-century British women artists
21st-century British women artists
Academics of London South Bank University
Alumni of Goldsmiths, University of London
Alumni of Sir John Cass College
Alumni of University College London
Artists from Somerset
English women artists
People from Taunton